Chlewiska may refer to the following places in Poland:
Chlewiska, Kuyavian-Pomeranian Voivodeship (north-central Poland)
Chlewiska, Lublin Voivodeship (east Poland)
Chlewiska, Siedlce County in Masovian Voivodeship (east-central Poland)
Chlewiska, Subcarpathian Voivodeship (south-east Poland)
Chlewiska, Szydłowiec County in Masovian Voivodeship (east-central Poland)
Chlewiska, Greater Poland Voivodeship (west-central Poland)